is a Japanese filmmaker, author, and poet. Best known on the festival circuit for the film Love Exposure (2008), he has been called "the most subversive filmmaker working in Japanese cinema today", a "stakhanovist filmmaker" with an "idiosyncratic" career.

Early life
Sion Sono was born in Aichi Prefecture in 1961. At the age of 17, he ran away from home, and joined a cult, which inspired his 2008 film Love Exposure. Sono started his career working as a poet before taking his first steps in film directing, making a series of short films on Super 8 as a student.

Career
After receiving a fellowship with the PIA, Sono made his first feature-length 16 mm film in 1990, Bicycle Sighs (Jitensha Toiki), a coming-of-age tale about two underachievers in perfectionist Japan. Sono co-wrote, directed, and starred in the film. In 1990, Sono moved to San Francisco, and was admitted to University of California, Berkeley; however, he never attended class, or learned English, instead spending his time watching B-movies and porno movies. After returning to Japan, he wrote and directed his second feature film, The Room (Heya) (1992), a bizarre tale about a serial killer looking for a room in a bleak, doomed Tokyo district. It participated in the Sundance Film Festival. The Room also toured on 49 festivals worldwide, including the Berlin Film Festival and the Rotterdam Film Festival. In the following years, Sono directed works such as the drama I Am Keiko (1997), the faux-documentary Utsushimi (2000), and the pink film Teachers of Sexual Play: Modelling Vessels with the Female Body (2000).

In 2001, Sono wrote and directed the horror film Suicide Club, his breakthrough feature, which follows a series of interconnected mass suicides. The film was very successful, gaining considerable notoriety in film festivals (including winning the Prize for "Most Ground-Breaking Film" at the 2003 Fantasia Film Festival), and developing a significant cult following over the years, even spawning a manga adaptation, as well as a companion piece novel written by Sono himself. In 2005, Sono released Noriko's Dinner Table, a prequel to Suicide Club, which also received acclaim. The film received special mention at the 40th Karlovy Vary International Film Festival.

In 2005, Sono also released three other films: Into a Dream (Yume no Naka e), a coming-of-age tale about the life of a theatre group member, Hazard, a crime film shot in New York City, (which was wide released in 2006) and Strange Circus, where Sono worked not only as director and writer, but also as composer and cinematographer. In 2006, he wrote and directed the drama film Balloon Club, Afterwards. In 2007, he wrote and directed the horror film Exte: Hair Extensions.

In 2008, Sono directed and wrote the 237 minutes-long epic Love Exposure, which is widely considered his most acclaimed and popular work to date. The film won the Caligari Film Award and the FIPRESCI Prize at Berlin International Film Festival, as well as the Best Asian Film award at the Fantasia Film Festival. Almost a decade later, Sono would release an extended mini-series version of the film titled, Love Exposure: The TV-Show. Love Exposure was the first film in Sono's thematic "Hate" trilogy. In 2009, Sono directed the dramas Be Sure To Share and Make The Last Wish.

Love Exposure was followed by the second and third installments, Cold Fish, released in 2010, and Guilty of Romance, released in 2011; both were acclaimed, and gained him the Best Director awards at the Yokohama Film Festival and the Hochi Film Awards. 2011 saw Sono be recognized in the United States with his work being highlighted in the cinema series Sion Sono: The New Poet presented at the Museum of Arts and Design in New York City.

In 2011 and 2012 respectively, Sono released two drama films inspired by the 2011 Fukushima nuclear disaster and Tohoku Earthquake: Himizu and The Land of Hope. The films were praised for their simplicity and seriousness compared to Sono's other works, and Himizu won the Marcello Mastroianni Award at the 68th Venice International Film Festival. In 2012, Sono edited and released the film Bad Film using footage from the production of a massive unreleased underground film he shot in 1995 starring the performance collective Tokyo GAGAGA.

In 2013, he directed the action-drama Why Don't You Play in Hell?, which was an international success, winning the People's Choice Award in the Midnight Madness section at the 2013 Toronto International Film Festival, and being distributed by the American company Drafthouse Films. In 2014, he directed Tokyo Tribe, a hip-hop musical adaptation of the manga of the same name. In 2015, five films directed by Sono were released: Shinjuku Swan, an action yakuza film, Love & Peace, a tokusatsu fantasy drama, Tag, an action horror film which was named Best Film of the year at the Fantasia Film Festival and the Fancine Malaga, The Virgin Psychics, an adaptation of the science fiction comedy manga series All Esper Dayo! by Kiminori Wakasugi, and The Whispering Star, a science fiction film which won the NETPAC Award at the 2015 Toronto International Film Festival.

In 2016, Sono was one of the directors chosen by Nikkatsu for its Roman Porno Reboot project, which asked five Japanese filmmakers to make a film that abided by the same rules as the studio's popular softcore pornography films released in the 1970s. Sono's film, the surrealist Antiporno, was praised for its feminist exploration of sexuality. In 2017, Sono directed a sequel to Shinjuku Swan, Shinjuku Swan II. In the same year, he wrote and directed a 9-part horror mini-series titled Tokyo Vampire Hotel, which was produced and released to streaming by Amazon. A special feature-length cut of the show running 2 hours and 22 minutes was shown at various festivals. Also he made a cameo appearance in Meisekimu Genshi's short film Ami. exe.

In 2018, it was announced that Sono was working on his first overseas production and English-language debut, a film titled Prisoners of the Ghostland, starring Nicolas Cage, which was described by Cage as "the wildest movie I've ever made." In 2019, Sono was hospitalized and underwent emergency surgery following a heart attack, temporarily halting pre-production on the film.

In 2019, Netflix released The Forest of Love, a crime film written, directed and co-edited by Sono, inspired by the murders of Japanese serial killer Futoshi Matsunaga. An extended, mini-series version of the film, titled The Forest of Love: Deep Cut was also released. In 2020, Sono wrote, directed and edited the film Red Post on Escher Street, which followed a film director's efforts to complete a film, and won the People's Choice Award at the Montreal Festival of New Cinema.

Sono co-wrote the 2022 film Moshikashite, Hyūhyū, credited under the pseudonym "Takayuki Yamamoto" to obscure his involvement.

Reception
In The Hollywood Reporter, Clarence Tsui writes that Sono has "established himself as one of the most idiosyncratic artists of his generation". Often considered a provocateur, Mike Hale of The New York Times argues that he is "the most recognizable, if not the most universally celebrated, director in Japan", which Sono himself explains by stating (in Hale's words) that Japanese critics generally "reserve their approval for work that doesn't 'embarrass' the nation." The director has said, "I do think an international audience understands my work more." Sono is considered an auteur, with his style being characterized by features such as grotesque violence, extreme eroticism, philosophical references, surreal imagery, and complex narratives. Sono's portrayal of women has been a subject of discussion, with some considering his works misogynist, and others claiming they are feminist. Common themes in his works include sex, cinema, cynicism, and modern Japanese society. Sono's work has often been described as belonging to, or being inspired by, the ero guro nansensu genre.

Sexual misconduct allegations 
On April 4, 2022, women's magazine Shūkan Josei reported allegations by two actresses and rumors inside the Japanese film industry that Sono has sexually harassed and made unwanted advances towards actresses for years. On April 5, in a video he posted on YouTube, actor Tak Sakaguchi, who has appeared in Sono's films, identified himself as the actor merely identified as "T" in the Shūkan Josei article, and confirmed he organized the drinking party that led to Sono allegedly assaulting one of the accusing actresses. 

On April 6, Shūkan Bunshun reported that producer Haruo Umekawa, who produced Sono's Love Exposure and Himizu, has allegedly pressured actresses for sexual favors in exchange for being cast in his films. 

In a statement released on April 13, 2022, actress Kiko Mizuhara said she had heard widespread rumors about Sono's sexual conduct and had been warned by a fellow actor when she was offered a role in his film. 

On May 18, 2022, Sono sued the publisher of Shūkan Josei for damages, saying the article contained inaccuracies. 

On January 26, 2023, Shūkan Bunshun reported that one of the accusing actresses had died by suicide the prior month.

Awards
Sono received the following awards for his films:
 2003: Fantasia International Film Festival – Most Ground-Breaking Film and Fantasia Ground-Breaker Award (Suicide Club)
 2005: Karlovy Vary International Film Festival – Don Quijote Award and Special Mention (Noriko's Dinner Table)
 2006: Berlin International Film Festival – Reader Jury of the "Berliner Zeitung" (Strange Circus)
 2007: Austin Fantastic Fest – Best Film (Exte)
 2009: Berlin International Film Festival – FIPRESCI Prize and Caligari Film Award (Love Exposure)
 2009: Fant-Asia Film Festival – Best Asian Film, Most Innovative Film and Special Jury Prize (Love Exposure)
 2010: Mainichi Film Concours – Best Director (Love Exposure)
 2015: Fantasia International Film Festival – Cheval Noir Award for Best Film (Tag)
 2015: Fantasia International Film Festival – Special Mention for its creative, surprising and monumental opening kill sequence (Tag)
 2015: Fantasia International Film Festival – Audience Award for Best Asian Feature (Love and Peace)
 2015: Toronto International Film Festival – NETPAC Award for World or International Asian Film Premiere (The Whispering Star)

Sono also received the following nominations for his films:
 2005: Karlovy Vary International Film Festival – Crystal Globe (Noriko's Dinner Table)
 2009: Asia Pacific Screen Awards – Achievement in Directing (Love Exposure)
 2010: Asian Film Awards – Best Director (Love Exposure)

Recurring collaborators

Filmography

Feature films

Short films

Television 
Sono has director and writer credits for two episodes and acted in one episode of the 2006 comedy television mini-series Jikō Keisatsu (Prescription Police) and wrote one episode of the 2007 series Kaette Kita Jikō keisatsu (Before Prescription Police). He directed, wrote, and acted in an episode of the 2013 series Minna! ESPer Dayo! and directed its 2015 television special continuation All Esper Dayo! SP. Sono directed and wrote the 2017 Amazon original mini-series Tokyo Vampire Hotel.

Bibliography
 Tokyo Gagaga (1993)
 Furo de Yomu Gendai Shi Nyuumon (2000)
 Jisatsu Saakuru: Kanzenban (2002)
 Jikou Keisatsu (2002)
 Yume no Naka e (2005)

Notes

References

External links

 
 Official website
 
 

1961 births
Living people
20th-century Japanese male writers
20th-century Japanese novelists
20th-century Japanese poets
21st-century Japanese novelists
21st-century Japanese poets
21st-century male writers
Fantasy film directors
Horror film directors
Japanese film directors
Japanese male poets
People from Toyokawa, Aichi
Writers from Aichi Prefecture